Lactarius pseudomucidus is a fungus native to the northwestern part of North America, often found in coastal and conifer forests. It has a charcoal brown cap, smooth and slimy, from 2–10 cm across, initially flat convex, becoming shallowly depressed. The gills are decurrent, white with a gray or yellow tinge, staining brownish. The stipe is 40–100 mm tall, hollow, brittle. Both the cap and stipe are mucilaginous. The flesh is gray and the latex is milky white, drying yellowish. There is only a slight odor, and the taste slowly becomes acrid. Spores are white in mass, ellipsoid, amyloid, about 8 μm long, with a reticulate decoration on the surface. The species is inedible. It resembles Lactarius argillaceifolius, which has a light orange-gray cap, and eastern North America's Lactarius mucidus.

References

Fungi described in 1979
Inedible fungi
pseudomucidus
Taxa named by Alexander H. Smith